Brumovice is a municipality and village in Opava District in the Moravian-Silesian Region of the Czech Republic. It has about 1,500 inhabitants.

Administrative parts

Villages of Kolná, Pocheň, Pustý Mlýn, Skrochovice and Úblo are administrative parts of Brumovice.

Geography
It is located on the border with Poland, the border is formed by the Opava River. The municipality lies mostly in the Nízký Jeseník mountain range, a small eastern part extends into the Opava Hilly Land.

History
The first written mention of Brumovice is from 1377. It became part of the Duchy of Krnov.

Brumovice was severely damaged during the Thirty Years' War. In the 1670s, Germanisation took place, but at the end of the century the village was still ethnically mixed. In the 18th century, during the rule of the House of Liechtenstein, Germanisation continued.

The village of Skrochovice was the site of the first Polenlager camp. It was set up by Nazi Germany in the former sugar factory in August 1939 in anticipation of the imminent attack on Poland. The KT camp was staffed before the actual invasion, with guards recruited by the SS from Krnov and Opava.

The camp, called KZ Skrochowitz was commanded by Heinrich Jöckel from the SS. It was an old sugar refinery set up for Polish military prisoners and civilian hostages captured during the September campaign. The camp functioned until December 15, 1939, with some 700 prisoners of Polish nationality brought in from Cieszyn Silesia and Upper Silesia.

Notable people
Libor Kozák (born 1989), footballer

References

External links

Skrochovice – the first Nazi camp in Czechoslovakia 
Concentration camp, Skrochovice, district Opava 

Villages in Opava District